Flávio Pinto de Souza (born 12 August 1980), or simply Flávio, is a Brazilian former football player.

Honours
Rio de Janeiro State League: 2000
Brazilian League: 2004
Santa Catarina State League: 2006

External links

1980 births
Living people
Brazilian footballers
Brazilian expatriate footballers
Fluminense FC players
FC Chernomorets Novorossiysk players
Santos FC players
Figueirense FC players
Botafogo de Futebol e Regatas players
Asteras Tripolis F.C. players
Aris Thessaloniki F.C. players
Athlitiki Enosi Larissa F.C. players
Criciúma Esporte Clube players
Russian Premier League players
Super League Greece players
Expatriate footballers in Russia
Expatriate footballers in Greece
Association football defenders
Sportspeople from Niterói